The 1906 Dulwich by-election was a by-election held on 15 May 1906 for the British House of Commons constituency of Dulwich in South London.

The by-election was triggered by the resignation of the serving Conservative Party Member of Parliament (MP), Dr Frederick Rutherfoord Harris, who was moving back to South Africa where he had previously lived for many years. 
The Unionist candidate was Bonar Law, former Parliamentary Secretary to the Board of Trade who had lost his seat in the Liberal landslide in the February general election. The Liberal Party candidate was David Williamson, who had also contested the February election.

Result 

The Conservative majority increased by over 900 votes, which the Times attributed not only to Bonar Law's candidature but also to the unpopularity of the Government's Education Bill, suggesting that the Catholic vote, estimated at 700, had gone mostly to the Conservatives as a result.

See also 
 List of United Kingdom by-elections
 Dulwich constituency

References 
 The Times, 16 May 1906

Dulwich,1906
Dulwich by-election
Dulwich by-election
Dulwich,1906
By-election, 1906